Adam Tom Heather (born 7 November 1972) is an English cricketer.  Heather is a left-handed batsman.  He was born in Manchester, Lancashire.

Heather made his debut for Northumberland in the 1996 Minor Counties Championship against Staffordshire.  Heather played Minor counties cricket for Northumberland from 1996 to 2007, which included 53 Minor Counties Championship matches and 20 MCCA Knockout Trophy matches.  In 1999, he made his List A debut against Ireland in the NatWest Trophy.  He made 4 further List A appearances for the county, the last coming against Middlesex in the 2005 Cheltenham & Gloucester Trophy.  In his 5 List A matches, he scored 138 runs at a batting average of 27.60, with a high score of 79.  This came against the Northamptonshire Cricket Board in the 2000 NatWest Trophy.

References

External links
Adam Heather at ESPNcricinfo
Adam Heather at CricketArchive

1972 births
Living people
Cricketers from Manchester
English cricketers
Northumberland cricketers